Robert Nisbet Smith (21 December 1953 – 22 February 2010) was a Scottish footballer who played most prominently for Hibernian and Leicester City. Smith was primarily a midfielder, but could also play at full back. Smith made 200 appearances in all competitions for both Hibs and Leicester.

Smith started his professional career with Hibs, where he played a part in the successful teams of the early and mid-1970s. Smith attracted the attention of Rangers manager Jock Wallace by scoring a spectacular goal for Hibs against Rangers in a 1976 match. Wallace became Leicester City manager in 1978, and signed Smith for an £85,000 transfer fee later that year. Smith helped Leicester win promotion to the top division twice during his spell with the club. He regularly captained Leicester during his eight years there.

He was loaned to Peterborough and Hibs during the 1982–83 season, and then returned to Hibs on a "permanent" basis in 1986. After leaving Hibs for the final time in 1987, Smith played a prominent defensive role for a Dunfermline side that gained promotion to the Premier Division, but was released at the end of that season.

After ending his career with spells at Partick Thistle and Berwick Rangers, Smith became a taxi driver, and later ran a pub in Dalkeith called Smith's Bar. He died in February 2010 after suffering from cancer, less than a week after former teammate Alan Gordon died from the same illness.

References

External links 

Sporting Heroes.net profile

1953 births
2010 deaths
Deaths from cancer in Scotland
People from Dalkeith
Association football midfielders
Scottish footballers
Berwick Rangers F.C. players
Dunfermline Athletic F.C. players
Hibernian F.C. players
Leicester City F.C. players
Partick Thistle F.C. players
Peterborough United F.C. players
Scottish Football League players
English Football League players
Association football fullbacks
Sportspeople from Midlothian